Přemysl Vojta (born 1983) is a Czech horn player.

Life 
He was then principal horn with the Konzerthausorchester Berlin and since 2015 with the WDR Sinfonieorchester Köln.

Since his success at the ARD International Music Competition in 2010, he has also performed as a concert soloist and chamber musician. His repertoire includes works with piano accompaniment and horn concertos by Joseph and Michael Haydn, Wolfgang Amadeus Mozart, Richard Strauss and composers of the modern era.

Prize 
 1st prize, audience award and prize for the best interpretation of the commissioned composition at the ARD International Music Competition (2010)

Recordings 
 Johannes Brahms: Piano trios (including clarinet trio and horn trio) with the Smetana Trio. CD published by Supraphon, 2012
 French Horn in Prague (works by Kofron, Sestak, Slavicky, Hlobil) with Tomoko Sawano, piano. CD published by Supraphon, 2012
 Metamorphosis (works by Beethoven, Schumann, Giselher Klebe) with Tobias Koch, piano. CD published by CAvi, 2017
 Michael & Joseph Haydn, Horn Concertos, Haydn Ensemble Prague, Michael Petrák conducting. CD released by CAvi, 2018

References

External links 
 

Classical horn players
Czech musicians
1983 births
Living people
Musicians from Brno